Christoph Haberland was a Baltic German architect, chief architect of Riga and is considered one of the most illustrious masters of classical architecture in Latvian history.

Biography 
Christoph Haberland was born in Riga to a mason on 1 January 1750. Both his parents originated from Saxony. In early age he started to learn from his father — mason Johann Andreas Haberland, who came from Saxony and in 1749 became a citizen of the city of Riga. Later Christoph Haberland traveled to Germany and as a journeyman studied in Berlin and Dresden. In 1777 Haberland returned to Riga, passed his exam of master craftsmen and was admitted in the mason guild. In 1778 he becomes the assistant of the Riga chief architect J.P. Leicht. When Leicht died in 1789 Haberland was appointed as his successor. He was chief architect of Riga until 1797.

Haberland was first to attempt the transformation of the medieval image of Riga according to the ideas of Enlightenment. His adapting many innovative ideas and a fresh look at architecture made Haberland one of the pioneers of classicism architecture in Riga. He designed about 20 dwelling houses in Riga, and some churches and manor houses around Riga and in Estonia. One of those churches, Katlakalna Lutheran Church, near Riga is considered his best work and is built as the Roman pantheon in miniature.

Christoph Haberland died on 7 March 1803 in Riga. He was interred in the Riga Great cemetery.

Gallery

See also
List of Baltic German architects

References 

Baltic-German people
Architects from Riga
18th-century architects
1750 births
1803 deaths
18th-century Latvian people